A savoury is the final course of a traditional British formal meal, following the sweet pudding or dessert course. The savoury is designed to "clear the palate" before the port is served. It generally consists of salty and plain elements.

Typical savouries are:
Scotch woodcock
Welsh rarebit
Sardines on toast
Angels on horseback
Devils on horseback

Savouries are often served on toast, fried bread or some kind of biscuit or cracker. In Eliza Action's 1845 book Modern Cookery for Private Families, there is just one recipe for savouries which appears to be a proto-croque monsieur, with a small footnote. In the twentieth century, however, entire books on the subject appeared, such as Good Savouries by Ambrose Heath (1934).

British snack foods
Courses (food)